Fiorano Canavese is a comune (municipality) in the Metropolitan City of Turin in the Italian region Piedmont, located about  north of Turin.

Fiorano Canavese borders the following municipalities: Montalto Dora, Lessolo, Val di Chy, Ivrea, Banchette, Banchette, Salerano Canavese, Samone, and Loranzè.

References

Cities and towns in Piedmont